TriBeCa Synagogue (also known as Synagogue for the Arts and Civic Center Synagogue) is an Orthodox synagogue in Tribeca, Manhattan, New York City. The synagogue is known for its modern building designed by architect William N. Breger in 1967. In designing the building, Breger paid special attention to the building's acoustics to allow for good sound quality without the need for electrical amplification, use of which is prohibited on Shabbat.

Notable members
Julian E. Zelizer
Meg Jacobs

References 

Synagogues in Manhattan
Modernist architecture in New York City
Tribeca
Synagogues completed in 1967